The 2014 Trofeo Ricardo Delgado Aray was a professional tennis tournament played on clay courts. It was the 11th edition of the tournament which was part of the 2014 ATP Challenger Tour. It took place in Manta, Ecuador between 30 June and 6 July 2014.

Singles main-draw entrants

Seeds

 1 Rankings are as of June 24, 2014.

Other entrants
The following players received wildcards into the singles main draw:

  Jorman Reyes
  Sam Barnett
  William Conigliaro
  Gonzalo Escobar

The following players received entry from the qualifying draw:
  Adrian Mannarino
  Facundo Bagnis
  César Ramírez
  Roberto Quiroz

Champions

Singles

ATP Challenger Tour singles matches for the 2014 Trofeo Ricardo Delgado Aray.

  Adrian Mannarino def.  Guido Andreozzi, 4–6, 6–3, 6–2

Doubles

ATP Challenger Tour doubles matches for the 2014 Trofeo Ricardo Delgado Aray.

  Chase Buchanan /  Peter Polansky def.  Luis David Martínez /  Eduardo Struvay, 6–4, 6–4

External links
Official Website

Trofeo Ricardo Delgado Aray
Manta Open
Trofeo Ricardo Delgado Aray